Graciliaria is a monotypic genus of gastropods belonging to the family Clausiliidae. The only species is Graciliaria inserta.

The species is found in Central Europe.

References

Clausiliidae